The Cheyenne Kid is a 1933 American Pre-Code Western film directed by Robert F. Hill and written by Jack Curtis. The film stars Tom Keene, Mary Mason, Roscoe Ates, Otto Hoffman and Al Bridge. The film was released on January 20, 1933, by RKO Pictures.

 Chasing a gambler that stole money, Tom Larkin gets his horse shot out from under him. Meeting an outlaw with a horse, after a fight Tom rides away on that horse. Arriving in town he is mistaken for the outlaw and offered a job of killing a man. But the man is the father of the girl that Tom's money was to go to but was stolen by the gambler.—Maurice VanAuken

Cast 
Tom Keene as Tom Larkin 
Mary Mason as Hope
Roscoe Ates as Bush
Otto Hoffman as Winters
Al Bridge as Denver
Alan Roscoe as Hollister
Anderson Lawler as Tate

References

External links 
 

1933 films
American black-and-white films
1930s English-language films
RKO Pictures films
American Western (genre) films
1933 Western (genre) films
Films directed by Robert F. Hill
Films produced by David O. Selznick
1930s American films